The core business of an organization is an idealized construct intended to express that organization's "main" or "essential" activity.

Core business process means that a business's success depends not only on how well each department performs its work, but also on how well the company manages to coordinate departmental activities to conduct the core business process, which is;

1. The market-sensing process
Meaning all activities in gathering marketing intelligence and acting on the information.

2. The new-offering realization process
Covering all activities in research, development and launching new quality offerings quickly and within budget.

3. The customer acquisition process
all the activities defining the target market and prospecting for new customers

4. The customer relationship management process
all the activities covering building deeper understanding, relationships and offerings to individual customers.

5. The fulfillment management process
all the activities in receiving and approving orders, shipping out on time and collecting payment.

In business, a core item is defined as an item that is immediately responsible for the revenues and cash flows of that particular business, whereas a non-core item is of a more strategic view, intended to benefit the revenue model and cash flows of the core items.

Therefor, the easiest way to identify a core business function is to look at whether the primary cash flows of the business revenue model runs directly through it, or not. Core business functions are always immediately involved in the primary cash flows of the revenue model or models of the business, whereas non-core business functions typically are not, which means that the business can hypothetically operate without non-core business functions without impacting primary cash flows, whereas the core business functions are essential to the continuance of its primary cash flows.

To be successful, a business needs to look for competitive advantages beyond its own operations. The business needs to look at the competitiveness value chain of suppliers, distributors and customers. Many companies today have partnered with specific suppliers and distributors to create a superior value delivery network.

References 

Kotler & Keller, Marketing management, 2009, p76

See also
Core competency

Business